Sovarani Memorial College, established in 1971, is an undergraduate college in Goalpota, Jagatballavpur, Howrah, West Bengal, India. The college is affiliated with the University of Calcutta.

Departments

Science
Chemistry
Physics
Mathematics
ZOOLOGY
BOTANY

Arts and Commerce
Bengali
English
History
Political Science
Philosophy
Economics
Commerce

Accreditation
The college is recognized by the University Grants Commission (UGC). It was accredited by the National Assessment and Accreditation Council (NAAC), and awarded A grade, an accreditation that has since then expired.

See also 
List of colleges affiliated to the University of Calcutta
Education in India
Education in West Bengal

References

External links
Sovaranai Memorial College

Universities and colleges in Howrah district
University of Calcutta affiliates
Educational institutions established in 1971
1971 establishments in West Bengal